Bacurí  may refer to:
 Platonia insignis, a tree species
 Bacuri (Maranhão), a municipality in the state of Maranhão in the Northeast region of Brazil
 Bacuri River, a river of Maranhão state in northeastern Brazil